Ognjen Matic (born 21 August 1989 in Split, Croatia, SFR Yugoslavia) is an Australian team handball player.

Career
Ognjen started his handball career at Cabramatta High School and went on to represent the U18 NSW handball team in 2005. Matic has been part of the NSW U21 Handball team for a number of years (2006, 2007 and 2008). Winning three nationals titles and earning him a spot in the Australian World Cup team which competed at the XXI World Championship held in Croatia. Matic made his debut for the Australian national team on 17 January 2009 against Hungary in which he opened Australia's score in the second half. In 2006 he was selected for the Open men's NSW Handball team at the age of 17, becoming one of the youngest players to have played for NSW in the sport of Handball. He was previously a PDHPE, PASS and IST teacher after his career as a professional handball player at Penrith Selective High School in Sydney, NSW.

Education
After being inspired by his high school PE teachers and the love he shared towards sport, and after he quit other sports, Ognjen went on to study at the Australian College of Physical Education (ACPE) located in the heart of Olympic Park. He has finished studying the Bachelor of Physical and Health Education and was a PDHPE and TAS teacher at Penrith Selective High School but left in late 2021.

Family
Ognjen has two younger siblings, brother Nikodin Matic born in 1992 and younger sister Petra Matic born in 1998.

References
 AHF-Junior Mens
 Fairfield Advance
 The WORD
 ACTHA

1989 births
Living people
Australian male handball players
Croatian emigrants to Australia